= Bavali Kheda =

- village
- Location within Madhya Pradesh Location within India
- Coordinates: 23.098804°N 77.341493°E
- Country: India
- State: Madhya Pradesh
- District: Bhopal
- Tehsil: Huzur

Population (2011)
  - Total: 136
- Time zone: UTC+5:30 (IST)
- ISO 3166 code: MP-IN
- Census code: 482561

Bavali Kheda is a village in the Bhopal district of Madhya Pradesh, India. It is located in the Huzur tehsil and the Phanda block.

== Demographics ==
According to the 2011 census of India, Bavali Kheda has 22 households. The effective literacy rate (i.e. the literacy rate of population excluding children aged 6 and below) is 10%.

Demographics (2011 Census)
	Total	Male	Female
Population	136	67	69
Children aged below 6 years	36	17	19
Scheduled caste	0	0	0
Scheduled tribe	136	67	69
Literates	10	6	4
Workers (all)	37	31	6
Main workers (total)	16	14	2
Main workers: Cultivators	10	8	2
Main workers: Agricultural labourers	3	3	0
Main workers: Household industry workers	1	1	0
Main workers: Other	2	2	0
Marginal workers (total)	21	17	4
Marginal workers: Cultivators	3	3	0
Marginal workers: Agricultural labourers	17	14	3
Marginal workers: Household industry workers	0	0	0
Marginal workers: Others	1	0	1
Non-workers	99	36	63
